The North Western Railroad was a shortline railroad located in the western part of the U.S. state of Pennsylvania in the United States. It organized in 1853, and was purchased by the Western Pennsylvania Railroad in 1859 after completing only a portion of its route.

History

Formation
The North Western Railroad was chartered by the state of Pennsylvania on February 9, 1853, and authorized to construct a rail line from a point at or west of Johnstown, Pennsylvania. The eastern terminus was to connect either with the Pennsylvania Railroad or the Allegheny Portage Railroad. The charter directed the railroad to pass through the towns of Freeport and Butler and proceed to the Pennsylvania-Ohio state boundary somewhere within Lawrence County, Pennsylvania.

The charter permitted each county through which the railroad passed to purchase stock worth up to 10 percent of the assessed value of the railroad. Butler and Lawrence counties both did so. Later in 1853, the Pennsylvania General Assembly enacted legislation amending the railroad's charter, permitting the city of Philadelphia to purchase up to 15,000 shares of the railroad.  In return, the city was to be given three seats on the railroad's board of directors. The city also made its purchase. Another $800,000 ($ in  dollars) in bonds were sold to finance construction.

Route and construction
The North Western Railroad settled on Blairsville as its eastern terminus.  A  branch line connected it with the Indiana Branch of the Pennsylvania Railroad. The western terminus of the North Western Railroad was New Castle in Lawrence County. The North Western intended to connect with the Cleveland and Mahoning Railroad there. The New Castle connection was important: The Pennsylvania Railroad ("the Pennsy") was a standard gauge road, as was the Cleveland and Mahoning. Until this point in time, the Pennsy could send no railcars west of Pittsburgh, since its connections there were with broad gauge railroads. By sending its cars over the North Western and the Cleveland and Mahoning, the Pennsy could move freight all the way to Chicago without the need for transshipment.

The route of the North Western Railroad was determined by its chief engineer, Robert Clark. The route he selected largely followed streams and rivers to achieve the lowest possible slope. Clark left the railroad's employ soon after finishing the route survey. Three major bridges were needed.

Construction began in August 1853. Most of the work of grading the route and building bridges was supervised by the new chief engineer, Samuel H. Kneass. By 1860, Kneass had graded and ballasted the line from Blairsville to Allegheny Junction in Butler County. Past Allegheny Junction, some grading had been completed in Butler but not Lawrence county. The superstructure of some bridges along the line was also complete.

Bankruptcy and purchase
The North Western Railroad ran out of construction funds in 1858. On July 5, 1859, the bondholders of the North Western Railroad took control of the company as part of a foreclosure proceeding. They obtained a charter for a new railroad, the Western Pennsylvania Railroad, and transferred control of the North Western to this new company. The Western Pennsylvania Railroad was in turn purchased by the Pennsy in 1862, which completed the line to Saltsburg in 1863. Traffic began running from Blairsville to Saltsburg while work continued on the rest of the line to Allegheny Junction. This latter part of the line opened to traffic in the fall of 1864. The Pennsy then extended the line to Freeport, and opened the last leg of the line on August 1, 1865.

References

Bibliography

Rail infrastructure in Pennsylvania
Railway lines opened in 1863
Defunct Pennsylvania railroads
Railway companies disestablished in 1859
1853 establishments in Pennsylvania
Railway companies established in 1853
Standard gauge railways in the United States 
American companies disestablished in 1859
1859 disestablishments in Pennsylvania
American companies established in 1853